Jacob Wysocki (born June 20, 1990) is an American actor and comedian.

Life and career 
Wysocki became interested in acting while still in high school. During these years, he also performed with ComedySportz and started to act in school plays. Afterwards he was cast as Dante Piznarski in the ABC Family drama series Huge.

He took his first leading role in 2011 alongside John C. Reilly in the dramedy Terri. In 2014 he starred in the horror movie Unfriended.

Filmography

Film

Television

Awards and nominations

References

External links 

 

1990 births
Living people
Male actors from California
American male film actors
American male television actors
American people of Polish descent
People from Lomita, California
Upright Citizens Brigade Theater performers
Comedians from California
21st-century American comedians